Clivina decellei is a species of ground beetle in the subfamily Scaritinae. It was described by Basilewsky in 1968.

References

decellei
Beetles described in 1968